Francesca Ferlaino (born 1977) is an Italian-Austrian experimental physicist known for her research on quantum matter. She is a professor of physics at the University of Innsbruck.

Biography
Francesca Ferlaino was born in Naples, Italy. She studied physics at the University of Naples Federico II (1995–2000) and was an undergraduate research fellow at the International School for Advanced Studies (SISSA) in Trieste (1999–2000). She did a PhD in physics at the University of Florence and the European Laboratory for Non-Linear Spectroscopy (LENS) (2001–2004). In 2007 she moved to the University of Innsbruck, Austria, where she was a research and teaching associate and started her own research group. In 2014 she became a professor of physics at the University of Innsbruck and research director at the Institute for Quantum Optics and Quantum Information (IQOQI) of the Austrian Academy of Sciences.

Work
Her research activity explores quantum phenomena in atomic gases at ultralow temperatures with contributions spanning topics including quantum matter of atoms and molecules and few-body and scattering physics. Over the last years, she focuses specifically on the strongly magnetic, and rather unexplored, Erbium and Dysprosium atomic species, realizing in 2012 world's first Bose-Einstein condensation of Erbium, and in 2018 the first dipolar quantum mixture of Erbium and Dysprosium. In 2019, she was able to prepare the first long-lived supersolid state, an elusive and paradoxical state where superfluid flow and crystal rigidity coexist. With these systems, she has explored a variety of many-body quantum phenomena dictated by the long-range and anisotropic dipolar interaction among the atoms. In 2021 she created supersolid states along two dimensions.

Awards and fellowships
Her work has earned her multiple awards, including the Grand Prix de Physique "Cécile-DeWitt Morette/École de Physique des Houches" from the French Academy of Sciences (2019), the Junior BEC Award (2019),  the Feltrinelli Prize (2017) and the Erwin Schrödinger Prize (2017), the highest award of the Austrian Academy of Sciences. In addition, she is the recipient of an Alexander von Humboldt Professorship (2013), a START-Prize (2009) and three ERC Grants (Starting 2010, Consolidator 2016 and Advanced 2022) She was elected as a Fellow of the American Physical Society (APS) in 2019, after a nomination from the APS Division of Atomic, Molecular and Optical Physics, "for ground-breaking experiments on dipolar quantum gases of erbium atoms, including the attainment of quantum degeneracy of bosons and fermions, studies on quantum-chaotical scattering, the formation of quantum droplets, and investigations on the roton spectrum".

References

External links 
 Dipolar Quantum Gas Group Research group of Francesca Ferlaino

1977 births
Living people
People from Naples
University of Naples Federico II alumni
Quantum physicists
21st-century Austrian physicists
Women physicists
Fellows of the American Physical Society

Academic staff of the University of Innsbruck
Members of the Austrian Academy of Sciences
European Research Council grantees